N. robustus  may refer to:
 Nassarius robustus, a sea snail species
 Nothobranchius robustus, the red victoria nothobranch, a fish species found in Kenya, Tanzania and Uganda
 Notomys robustus, the great hopping mouse, an extinct rodent species known only from skulls found in owl pellets in the Flinders Ranges in Australia

See also
 Robustus (disambiguation)